PPFA may refer to:
 Planned Parenthood Federation of America (PPFA), or often referred to simply as Planned Parenthood
 Professional Picture Framers Association, international organisation
 Personnel Professional Friendly Advice Ltd, UK limited company